The Menarsha synagogue attack took place on 5 August 1949 in the Jewish quarter of Damascus, Syria. The grenade attack claimed 12 lives.

Background
The security situation of the Syrian Jewish community deteriorated in the late 1930s, during a period of increased Arab nationalism, pressure for independence from the French Empire leading to Syrian independence in 1946, World War. Anti-Western and Arab nationalist fervour took on an increasingly anti-Jewish tone. Before and after the establishment of the State of Israel in 1948, the Jews in Syria faced greater discrimination as the government adopted anti-Jewish measures. During this period, Jews and their property became the target of numerous attacks, including the Aleppo pogrom in 1947.

Attack
On Friday night, 5 August 1949, several hand grenades were thrown into the Menarsha Synagogue in Damascus that killed 12 Jews, 8 of them children, and injured about 30. The attack occurred at the time of the Lausanne Conference, when Syria and other frontline Arab states were conducting armistice talks with Israel at Lausanne, Switzerland. The armistice agreement between Israel and Syria had been signed on 20 July 1949. A simultaneous attack was also carried out at the Great Synagogue in Aleppo.

Reaction

Official condolences
Syrian President Husni al-Za'im sent his personal representative to visit the carnage area and ordered a legal probe into it.

Investigation
The police attributed the attack to an underground movement calling itself Arab Redemption Suicide Phalange, and held numerous suspects. On 9 August, a seventeen-year-old Syrian veteran of the 1948 Arab–Israeli War confessed that he and two friends were behind the attack. President al-Za'im ordered the execution of the accused, but a few days later the coup of Colonel Sami al-Hinnawi took place and al-Za'im was executed. In 1950, the suspects of the attack were acquitted due to lack of evidence.

References

Mass murder in 1949
Terrorist incidents in 1949
Terrorist attacks attributed to Palestinian militant groups
20th-century attacks on synagogues and Jewish communal organizations
Jewish Syrian history
1948 Arab–Israeli War
Anti-Jewish pogroms by Muslims 1941-49
Jews and Judaism in Damascus
20th century in Damascus
1949 riots
Attacks on buildings and structures in Damascus
1949 murders in Syria
Terrorist incidents in Syria in the 1940s
1949 in Judaism
Antisemitism in Syria
Mass murder in Damascus
Attacks on religious buildings and structures in Asia
Grenade attacks
Massacres in 1949